The Liberal Left (IL) was a political party led by Santiago Alba which split from the Liberal Party in 1917, after the crisis in the Romanones government.

The party was disestablished in 1923 after Miguel Primo de Rivera's coup.

References

Liberal Party (Spain, 1880)
Defunct political parties in Spain
Political parties established in 1913
Political parties disestablished in 1923
1913 establishments in Spain
1923 disestablishments in Spain
Restoration (Spain)